Claude Massey (1 November 188921 May 1968) was an Australian public servant and diplomat.

References

|-

|-

1889 births
1968 deaths
Ambassadors of Australia to Egypt
High Commissioners of Australia to Singapore
University of Sydney alumni